The Asian lesser white-toothed shrew (Crocidura shantungensis) is a species of mammal in the family Soricidae. It is found in Siberia, China, Korea, and Japan.

References 

Mammals of China
Crocidura
Mammals described in 1901
Taxonomy articles created by Polbot